Poecilomyrma is a genus of ants in the subfamily Myrmicinae. Its two species are restricted to the Fijian archipelago. Although rare, the genus is known from all seven of the largest islands of Fiji.

Species
Poecilomyrma myrmecodiae Mann, 1921
Poecilomyrma senirewae Mann, 1921

References

External links

Myrmicinae
Ant genera